Juba II or Juba of Mauretania (Latin: Gaius Iulius Iuba;  or ; c. 48 BC – AD 23) was the son of Juba I and client king of Numidia (30–25 BC) and Mauretania (25 BC – AD 23). Aside from his very successful reign, he was a highly respected scholar and author. His first wife was Cleopatra Selene II, daughter of Queen Cleopatra VII of Ptolemaic Egypt and Roman Triumvir Mark Antony.

Life

Early life and education
Juba II was a Berber prince from Numidia. He was the only child and heir of King Juba I of Numidia; his mother's identity is unknown, though Juba II claimed to be a descendant of General Hannibal (Scol. Lucan, Pharsalia 8.287). In 46 BC, his father was defeated by Julius Caesar (in Thapsus, North Africa), and in 40 BC Numidia became a Roman province. His father had been an ally of the Roman General Pompey.

Several modern scholars cite his age at Caesar's triumph in 46 BC as four or six giving rise to the typically cited birth year range of 52-50 BC, which his biographer, Duane Roller, believes is incorrect. Roller instead places his birth in early 48 BC because the Greek term brephos was used for him which means infant. The word for a child of age 4 to 6 is pais which was not used for him in the ancient sources. Therefore, Roller places his age in the triumph at anywhere from 2 months to 2 years, which actually indicates a birth year range between 48 and 46 BC.

Juba II was brought to Rome by Julius Caesar and he took part in Caesar's triumphal procession. In Rome he learned the Latin and Greek, became romanized and was granted Roman citizenship. Through dedication to his studies, he is said to have become one of Rome's best educated citizens, and by age 20 he wrote one of his first works entitled Roman Archaeology. He was raised by Julius Caesar and later by his great-nephew Octavian (future Emperor Augustus). While growing up, Juba II accompanied Octavian on military campaigns, gaining valuable experience as a leader. He fought alongside Octavian in the Battle of Actium in 31 BC.

Restoration to the Numidian throne
In 30 BC, Octavian restored Juba II as king of Numidia. Juba II established Numidia as an ally of Rome. Probably as a result of his services to Augustus in a campaign in Hispania, between 26 BC and 20 BC the Emperor arranged for him to marry Cleopatra Selene II, giving her a large dowry and appointing her queen. His kingdom replaced the province of Africa Nova which included territories of both Eastern Numidia and Western Numidia. This kingdom of Numidia (except the territory of Western Numidia) was in 25 BC directly annexed to the Roman Empire as the part of the Roman province of Africa Proconsularis and Juba II received Mauretania as his kingdom, enlarged by territory of Western Numidia.

Reign in Mauretania
According to Strabo, upon the death of the Mauretanian king Bocchus II, who was an ally of the Romans, his kingdom was briefly governed directly by Rome (33 BC - 25 BC), then in 25 BC Juba II received it from Augustus.  When Juba II and Cleopatra Selene moved to Mauretania, they named their new capital Caesaria (modern Cherchell, Algeria), in honour of Augustus. The construction and sculpture projects at Caesaria and another city, Volubilis, display a rich mixture of Egyptian, Greek and Roman architectural styles.

Cleopatra is said to have exerted considerable influence on Juba II's policies. Juba II encouraged and supported the performing arts, research of the sciences and research of natural history. Juba II also supported Mauretanian trade. The Kingdom of Mauretania was of great importance to the Roman Empire. Mauretania engaged in trade all across the Mediterranean, particularly with Spain and Italy. Mauretania exported fish, grapes, pearls, figs, grain, wooden furniture and purple dye harvested from certain shellfish, which was used in the manufacture of purple stripes for senatorial robes. Juba II sent a contingent to Iles Purpuraires to re-establish the ancient Phoenician dye manufacturing process. Tingis (modern Tangier), a town at the Pillars of Hercules (modern Strait of Gibraltar) became a major trade centre. In Gades, (modern Cádiz) and Carthago Nova (modern Cartagena) in Spain, Juba II was appointed by Augustus as an honorary Duovir (a chief magistrate of a Roman colony or town).

The value and quality of the Mauretanian coinage became highly regarded. The Greek historian Plutarch describes him as 'one of the most gifted rulers of his time'. Between 2 BC and AD 2, he travelled with Gaius Caesar (a grandson of Augustus), as an advisor to the Eastern Mediterranean. In AD 21, Juba II made his son Ptolemy his co-ruler. Juba II died in AD 23. Juba II was buried alongside his first wife in the Royal Mausoleum of Mauretania. Ptolemy then became the sole ruler of Mauretania.

Marriages and children

 First marriage to Greek Ptolemaic princess Cleopatra Selene II (40 BC – 6 AD). Their children were:
Ptolemy of Mauretania born in ca 10 BC/ 5 BC
 A daughter of Cleopatra and Juba, whose name has not been recorded (based on Roman naming conventions she would have had the nomen "Julia" but like many client royals she may have never used it), is mentioned in an inscription. She is sometimes assumed to have had the same cognomen as her niece Drusilla.
 Second marriage to Glaphyra, a princess of Cappadocia, and widow of Alexander, son of Herod the Great. Alexander was executed in 7 BC for his involvement in a conspiracy against his father. Glaphyra married Juba II in 6 AD or 7 AD. She then fell in love with Herod Archelaus, another son of Herod the Great and Ethnarch of Judea. Glaphyra divorced Juba to marry him in 7 AD.

Works

Writings

Juba wrote a number of books in Greek on history, natural history, geography, grammar, painting and theatre. He compiled a comparison of Greek and Roman institutions known as Όμοιότητες (Resemblances). His guide to Arabia became a bestseller in Rome. Only fragments of his works survive. He collected a substantial library on a wide variety of topics, which no doubt complemented his own prolific output. Pliny the Elder refers to him as an authority 65 times in the Natural History and in Athens, a monument was built in the Gymnasium of Ptolemy in recognition of his writings.

Ten works by Juba II have provisionally been identified, but all are fragmentary:

Roman Archaeology, in two books
Resemblances, in at least fifteen books
On Painting, in at least eight books
Theatrical History, in at least seventeen books
The Wanderings of Hanno, possibly a translation of the periplus of Hanno the Navigator
On Euphorbion, a pamphlet
Libyka, in at least three books
On Arabia, which is the only work by Juba that may have been in Latin
On Assyria, in two books
Epigrams, of which six lines of one quoted by Athenaeus are all that survives

Juba's works survive only in quotations or citations by others, in both Greek and Latin. There are around 100 of these, about half in Pliny the Elder's Natural History. Others can be found in Athenaeus, Plutarch, Aelian, Harpokration, Dioscorides, Galen, Philostratus, Herodian, Tatian, Ammianus Marcellinus, Solinus, Hesychius of Miletus, Stephanos of Byzantium, Photios, the Etymologicum Magnum, the Geoponica and various scholia on classical authors.

Juba may have written plays, but these are not quoted and no titles are known. The supposition relies on a reading of a passage in Athenaeus. There are two late citations to Juba that seem to be spurious. Photios cites the otherwise unknown On the Deterioration of Words, while Fulgentius cites a certain Fisiologia. Both may have been epitomes of Juba's authentic works.

Contributions to science
Juba II was a noted patron of the arts and sciences and sponsored several expeditions and biological research. According to Pliny the Younger, Juba II sent an expedition to the Canary Islands and Madeira. He named them the Canary Islands for the particularly ferocious dogs (canarius – from canis – meaning of the dogs in Latin) the expedition found there.

Flavius Philostratus recalled one of his anecdotes: "And I have read in the discourse of Juba that elephants assist one another when they are being hunted, and that they will defend one that is exhausted, and if they can remove him out of danger, they anoint his wounds with the tears of the aloe tree, standing round him like physicians."

Juba's Greek physician Euphorbus wrote that a succulent spurge found in the High Atlas was a powerful laxative. In 12 BC, Juba named this plant Euphorbia after Euphorbus, in response to Augustus dedicating a statue to Antonius Musa, Augustus's own personal physician and Euphorbus's brother. Botanist and taxonomist Carl Linnaeus assigned the name Euphorbia to the entire genus in the physician's honour. Euphorbia was later called Euphorbia regis-jubae ("King Juba's euphorbia") to honour the king's contributions to natural history and his role in bringing the genus to notice. The palm tree genus Jubaea is also named after Juba.

References

Further reading
 Draycott, Jane (22 May 2018). "Cleopatra's Daughter: While Antony and Cleopatra have been immortalised in history and in popular culture, their offspring have been all but forgotten. Their daughter, Cleopatra Selene, became an important ruler in her own right". History Today.

External links 

 Juba II king of Mauretania – Dictionary of Greek and Roman Biography and Mythology
 Juba II Encyclopædia Britannica

50s BC births
23 deaths
1st-century BC Berber people
1st-century BC rulers in Africa
1st-century Berber people
1st-century disestablishments
1st-century rulers in Africa
Berber writers
Kings of Mauretania
Kings of Numidia
Ptolemaic dynasty
Roman client rulers
Julii